Tommy Raymond Kristiansen (born 26 May 1989) is a Norwegian professional ice hockey forward who is currently playing for the Stavanger Oilers in the GET-ligaen.

Kristiansen played four seasons with the Stavanger Oilers in Norway's GET-ligaen through the conclusion of the 2016–17 season, before leaving as a free agent to sign a one-year deal with German outfit Krefeld Pinguine of the DEL on April 16, 2017.

He participated at the 2011 and 2012 IIHF World Championships as a member of the Norway men's national ice hockey team.

Career statistics

Regular season and playoffs

International

References

External links

1989 births
Living people
HV71 players
Krefeld Pinguine players
People from Sarpsborg
Norwegian ice hockey forwards
Norwegian expatriate ice hockey people
Norwegian expatriate sportspeople in Germany
Norwegian expatriate sportspeople in Sweden
Ice hockey players at the 2018 Winter Olympics
Olympic ice hockey players of Norway
Sparta Warriors players
Stavanger Oilers players
Sportspeople from Viken (county)